Carleton Leonard Young (June 28, 1937 – February 26, 2002) was an American film and television actor. He was known for playing Cord in the American western television series Gunslinger.

Life and career 
Young was born in New York, the son of Barbara Davis and Carleton G. Young, a film, radio and television actor. He and his family moved to Hollywood, California in 1943. Young attended University High School, Fairfax High School, and Los Angeles City College, where he learned about drama and play management. He served in the United States Air Force.

While serving, Young worked for the American Forces Network, as he directed, produced and wrote for the broadcast service. After being discharged, he was under contract for the 20th Century Studios. Young also attended acting coach and actor Ben Bard's drama school for which he worked on jobs such as a parcel packer and parking enforcement officer to pay his tuition. He began his career in 1959, appearing in the western television series Fury. Young also played Cabot in the 1960 film Walk Like a Dragon, which was his film debut.

Young guest-starred in television programs including Tombstone Territory, Maverick, The Streets of San Francisco, Bonanza, Mannix, Star Trek: The Original Series, Lawman, Wagon Train, 77 Sunset Strip, Mission: Impossible and Laramie. He also appeared in the films He Rides Tall (1964), Charro! (1969), A Man Called Sledge (1970), Chrome and Hot Leather (1971), Black Gunn (1972), Play It as It Lays (1972), Superchick (1973), The Outfit (1973), Policewomen (1974), Act of Vengeance (1974), Guyana: Cult of the Damned (1979) and Up Your Alley (1989). In 1961, Young starred in the new CBS western television series Gunslinger, playing the main character, Cord. He co-starred with Preston Foster, who played Captain Zachary Wingate; Charles H. Gray who played Pico McGuire; Dee Pollock, who played Billy Urchin; Midge Ware, who played Amby Hollister; and John Pickard who played Sgt. Major Murdock.

Young starred in the 1964 film Taggart along with actor, Dan Duryea. He retired in 1993, last appearing in the science fiction television series Quantum Leap, where Young played actor, director, screenwriter, and visual artist John Huston.

Death 
Young died in February 2002 of lung cancer at his home in West Hollywood, California, at the age of 64.

References

External links 

Rotten Tomatoes profile

1937 births
2002 deaths
Male actors from New York (state)
Deaths from lung cancer in California
American male film actors
American male television actors
20th-century American male actors
Western (genre) television actors
United States Air Force airmen
American radio directors
American radio producers
American radio writers